The  is a Kofun period burial mound located in the city of Fuchū, Tokyo in the Kantō region of Japan. It received protection as a National Historic Site in 1970.

Overview
The Musashi Fuchu Kumano Jinja Kofun is located on the north side of a Kumano shrine in Fuchū City. The tumulus was believed for centuries to be a natural hill, although there was a local tradition that it contained a cave. The shrine itself was relocated to this site in 1777 and has no connection with the tumulus. In 1990, the shrine decided to remove part of the tumulus to make room for the construction of a new storage shed for its mikoshi floats, and the hill was discovered to be of artificial construction made of rammed earth and river stones. However, as the location is far from any known kofun tumuli clusters, even at this time it was not recognized as being a kofun. In 1994, further investigation using ground penetrating radar indicated the presence of a large stone structure near the top of the mound, raising the possibility that this was indeed a burial tumulus. Shortly afterwards, a local historical journal article dated August 1884 was discovered, stating that a burial chamber had been found within the mound, and that this chamber was divided into three rooms. The innermost room contained two human skeletons, and artifacts resembling "rusty nails". A complete archaeological excavation was conducted from May 2003, in which the hill was confirmed to be a three-tier , with two square base tiers and an upper dome. It is the third of this style of tumulus to have been discovered in Japan, and is one of the largest kofun in the Musashi area. The bottom tier is 32 meters long on each side, the middle tier is 23 meters long on each side, and the dome has a diameter of 16 meters and a height of 2.5 meters. The burial chamber had a length of 8.8 meters. Traces of a moat with a width of six meters and depth of two meters have been found on the east and south sides of the tumulus. 

As the tomb had been opened in the Meiji period, and possibly earlier, there were few grave goods; however, artifacts recovered included one silver inlaid sheath with metal fittings, six glass beads, three iron swords, and about 300 iron nails. From these artifacts, the tumulus was built from the middle to the latter half of the 7th century AD.  

In 2005 it was designated as a National Historic Site. It is located about 8 minutes on foot from Nishifu Station on the JR EastNambu Line.

Gallery

See also

List of Historic Sites of Japan (Tōkyō)

References

External links

 Fuchū city official home page 
 Tokyo Cultural properties Database 

Kofun
History of Tokyo
Fuchū, Tokyo
Historic Sites of Japan
Musashi Province